Dar Bagh (also Romanized as Dar Bāgh and Dar-e Bāgh; also known as Darb-e Bāgh) is a village in Howmeh Rural District, in the Central District of Bam County, Kerman Province, Iran. At the 2006 census, its population was 115, in 42 families.

References 

Populated places in Bam County